() is a small weekly newspaper, based in the city of Ballerup near Copenhagen, Denmark. Ballerup Bladet A/S, a subsidiary of Dansk AvisTryk A/S, is the publisher of the paper.

References

External links
 Official website

Danish-language newspapers
Mass media in Ballerup
Publications with year of establishment missing
Weekly newspapers published in Denmark